Saint-Émile-de-Suffolk is a municipality in the Outaouais region of Quebec, Canada, part of the Papineau Regional County Municipality. Until 1994 it was known as United Township Municipality of Suffolk-et-Addington.

Geography
Its principal streams are the Little Rouge River and the Suffolk Creek that feeds it, the first being a tributary of the Petite-Nation River.

History

Suffolk Township (named after the county in England) was already on the Gale and Duberger map of 1795, but not officially established until 1874. Municipally it was part of the United Township Municipality of Hartwell-et-Suffolk until 1880 when the municipality separated and the Township Municipality of Suffolk was formed, taking effect on January 1, 1881.

In 1885, Addington Township (named after Henry Addington, 1st Viscount Sidmouth)  was merged with Suffolk Township, creating the United Township Municipality of Suffolk-et-Addington. This county consisted of Vinoy, Namur, Saint-Émile, Lac-des-Plages and part of Vendée.

In 1889, the Parish of Saint-Émile-de-Suffolk was formed. This name paid tribute to Émile Quesnel of Saint-Andre-Avellin, who had been particularly generous toward the early settlers of the area.

Piece by piece, portions of the united township were detached to form new municipalities: Vinoy in 1920 (which became part of Chénéville in 1996), Lac-des-Plages in 1950, and finally Namur in 1964.

In 1994, the name and status were changed to that of Municipality of Saint-Émile-de-Suffolk.

Demographics

Local government
List of former mayors:

 Serge Carrière (2001–2005)
 Martin Blais (2005-2009)
 Michel Samson (2009-2013)
 Hugo Desormeaux (2013–present)

Education

Sir Wilfrid Laurier School Board operates Anglophone public schools:
 Laurentian Regional High School in Lachute

References

External links

Incorporated places in Outaouais
Municipalities in Quebec